Kalavad is a city and a municipality in Jamnagar district in the Indian state of Gujarat. Post Office Pin Code is 361160. Kalavad is known for shitla mataji temple.

Geography
It has an average elevation of 87 metres (285 feet).

Demographics
 India census, Kalavad had a population of 24,857. Males constitute 50% of the population and females 50%. Kalavad has an average literacy rate of 68%, higher than the national average of 59.5%: male literacy is 73%, and female literacy is 63%. In Kalavad, 11% of the population is under 6 years of age.

Transport 
National Highway 927D connects Kalavad with Dhoraji and Jamnagar.

References

Cities and towns in Jamnagar district